Novokaragushevo (Yañı Qarağoş) is a rural locality (a village) in Kashkalevsky Selsoviet, Burayevsky District, Bashkortostan, Russia. The population was 26 as of 2010. There are 2 streets.

Geography 
Novokaragushevo is located 39 km southeast of Burayevo (the district's administrative centre) by road. Lenin-Bulyak is the nearest rural locality.

References 

Rural localities in Burayevsky District